Wattwiller is a commune in the Haut-Rhin department of the Grand Est region, which lies in the north-eastern part of France.

Located near the Vosges mountain rocky spur of Hartmannswillerkopf, Wattwiller was a strategic village in the Alsace, and suffered attacks in or near it during the Thirty Years' War and in both World Wars.

Nowadays Wattwiller is best known for its mineral water.

Population

See also
 Communes of the Haut-Rhin department

References

Communes of Haut-Rhin